Lipscomb may refer to:

People
Lipscomb (surname)

Places
United States
Lipscomb, Alabama
Lipscomb, Texas
Lipscomb County, Texas

Others
 Lipscomb House, Durham, North Carolina, United States
 Lipscomb University, United States
 , United States Navy submarine

See also 
 Lipscombe